Arette is a commune in the Pyrénées-Atlantiques department in the Nouvelle-Aquitaine region of southwestern France. It is located in the arrondissement of Oloron-Sainte-Marie and the canton of Oloron-Sainte-Marie-1.

Geography
Arrete is located some 15 km south by south-west of Oloron-Sainte-Marie and some 4 km south-east of Aramits. It lies close to both the French Basque region and borders Spain in the south. It is within the borders of Béarn, one of the traditional French provinces.

Access to the commune is by French rail SNCF to Pau, and a short bus ride to Arrete.  Less scenic is the automobile route: D918 road from Lanne-en-Barétous in the north-west coming south-east to the village then continuing east to Issor. The D132 goes south from the village down the length of the commune following a tortuous mountain route before exiting the southern border of the commune over the Col de la Pierre St Martin (1,760m), which is also the border with Spain, and becoming the Spanish NA-137 which continues to Isaba. The D341 also goes south-east from the village then south, connecting with the D241 at the Col de Labays (1,351m) going east to join the E7 highway south of Sarrance, then continuing along the south-western border to join the D441 south of the commune. The D133 also goes north from the village to Aramits.

Bus Route 848 of the Intercity Network of Pyrénées-Atlantiques (Transports 64) links Arette to Oloron-Sainte-Marie.
 
It is also mountainous (the La Pierre Saint-Martin ski resort is within its borders, for example) and its highest peak is the 2,315 m Soum Couy, which is situated not far from the 2,504 m Pic d'Anie, the highest peak in the western Pyrenees. From Pic d'Anie the mountain range extends downwards for approximately 20 km, forming both sides of the Aspe Valley to the north-west. The Vert d'Arette (a tributary of the Vert) flows through this valley. The ancient village (also named Arette) from which the commune extends is located at an altitude of 316 m in the valley of Barétous, which lies between the aforementioned Aspe valley, to its east, and the Basque province of Soule, to its west.

Hydrography
Located in the Drainage basin of the Adour, the commune is the source of numerous tributaries of the Vert which is itself a tributary of Gave d'Oloron. The largest tributary flowing through the commune is the Vert d'Arrette however many other streams flow north towards the Vert including: the Abat Daurèye and its tributary, the Banu Erreka (accompanied by the Ruisseau de Aurèye); Ibarcis Erreka; the Lancy; the Ruisseau de Gurré and its tributary the Ruisseau de Lagaretche; the Ruisseau de Hournères and its tributary, the Ouettone; the Ruisseau de Légorre and its tributary, the Cassiau de Ber; the streams of Nécore, Soulayets, Talu Gros, and Virgou with the tributary of the latter, the Arrigau (accompanied itself in the commune by the Bachère).

The Gave de Lourdios, a tributary of the Gave d'Aspe, and its tributaries, the Arric and the Moulia (and their tributaries, Casteigt Erreka and the Ruisseau de Poussious) also pass through the commune. The Gave de Sainte-Engrâce, a tributary of the Saison, and its tributary, the Montcholako Erreka also flow in the territory of the commune.

Places and Hamlets

 Abat d'Ibarry
 Adam
 Gouffre d'Ahuzthéguia
 Ambielle
 Ambile
 Cabane d'Ance
 Apons
 Pont de l'Araille
 Gouffre de l'Arbre Sec
 Pas d'Arlas
 L'Arre de Bas
 Arrègle
 Arritsens
 Aspit
 Aurasse
 Pont d'Aurèye
 Cabane d'Auriste
 Ayesten
 Barbé
 Le Pas des Basques
 Bayrès
 Bécari
 Bélatch Paoussaguia
 Bellegarde
 Bellocq
 Bernardicou
 Bersacalongue
 Ancien Moulin de Bignau
 Col de Bissouritto (995 metres)
 Bitailloué
 Bonnehe
 Bonneu
 Bordehore
 Col de Boticotch
 Bois de Bouchet
 Bourdès
 Bourdet
 Les Bourrugues
 Burs
 Coume de Cagastié
 Cam dét Ragutio
 Camgros
 Camou
 Candau
 Capdelabat
 Capdeville
 Pas de Caque
 Casabonne
 Casamayou
 Casaurang
 Casaux
 La Cassette
 Cassiau
 Castagne (Two places)
 Cataplous
 Cerciat
 Château-Forez
 Pédaing de Chousse
 Plateau de la Chousse
 Col de Cissaugue or Nécore
 Pont de Cissaugue
 Costemale
 Costes
 Coudure
 Couillarsut
 Cabane du Coup
 Couretcoup
 Courétot
 Les Courréges
 Cousturé
 Coutchet de Lacq
 Coutchet dets Crapes
 L'Arre de Soum Couy
 La Croix du Berger
 Croix des Contrebandiers
 Davancens
 Domecq
 Fontaine Dorbe
 Source de l'Ermite
 Cabane d'Escuret de Bas
 Cabanes d'Escuret
 Esperabens
 Pas des Estes
 Estournès
 Estratte
 Cabane de Féas
 Pont du Fort
 Frinchaboy
 Gabarrat
 Col de Garbas
 Gesta
 Goaillardeu
 Guilhers (Sheds and fountain)
 Guren
 Cap de Gurré (ruins)
 Handu
 Source d'Harrigagna
 Hondagneu
 Grange Hondagneu
 Houillis
 Houndane (spring)
 Pont du Hourat
 Houratate
 Hourcate
 Hournères
 Hum
 Borde de Hum
 Ibarry - Coigt de Hecore
 Granges d'Irasts
 Coume d'Issaux
 Cabane d'Issort
 Jantet
 Labarthe
 Labatrère
 Cabanes de Labays
 Col de Labays (1,351m)
 Laborde
 Laclouque
 Lacoume
 Laculère
 Lagarde
 Lagaretche
 Lagrave
 Lahore
 Pas de Lamayou
 Lancy
 Lapeyre
 Coume de Larrayet
 Larricq
 Croix de Larricq
 Le pont Larron
 Camp de Larruga
 Lassalle
 Bois de Lèche
 Lèchéko Zingla
 Légorre d'Ibarry
 Lembeyou
 Gouffre Lépineux
 Mail de Lerre
 Létone
 Pas de la Leugue
 Libarde
 Col de Lie (601m)
 Lilles
 Longis
 Lourdios d'Arette
 La Lousère
 Lucq
 Col de Mahourat
 Le Mail blanc
 Les Malices
 Cayolar de Mantchola or Cabane d'Etchébar
 Pas de Massaré
 Massaugues
 Coume Mayou
 Maysou
 Mesplou
 Bois de Métouret
 Mirassou 
 Mirassou Bas
 Mirassou Haut
 Moulia
 La Mouline
 Moura
 Nario
 Nouqué
 Noutary
 Noye
 Oron
 Cabane d'Oumarre
 Bois de l'Oumbre-del-Hourcq
 Gouffre de l'Ours
 Pagnon
 Pédaing
 Pélou
 Les Pernes
 Cabane de la Pernotte (ruins)
 Pescamou
 Borde des Peyres
 Peyret
 Arette La Pierre Saint-Martin
 Col de la Pierre St Martin
 L'Arre Planère
 Pouey
 Poursuca
 Le Pourtet
 Prat
 Granges de Prat
 La Puyade
 Rachet
 Roucam
 Pène Rouye
 Sainte-Gracie
 Saint-Marty
 Salanove
 Salet
 Salies
 Sarrelangue
 Saudiat
 Plateau de Séguitte
 Pas de Single
 Bois de Soudet
 Cabanes de Soudet
 Soulaing
 Soubies
 Soubirou
 Soulé
 Borde de Soulé
 Sous Pène
 Superville
 Col de Suscousse or Garatéko L'époua
 Talou
 Talou d'Arnaune
 Talou de Bouc
 Tamarpouey
 Tapie
 Col de Taules
 Braca de Termy
 Le Terrail
 Gouffre La Tête Sauvage
 Tourette
 Tourumy (harnessed spring)
 Col de Tremeil
 Camp d'Urdette
 Zélukobortha (chasm)

Neighbouring communes and villages

Toponymy
The commune name in béarnais is Arèta (according to the classical norm of Occitan). The name comes from the Basque ar- meaning "stone" and from the locative suffix -eta meaning "stony place".

The following table details the origins of the commune name and other names in the commune.

Sources:
Raymond: Topographic Dictionary of the Department of Basses-Pyrenees, 1863, on the page numbers indicated in the table. 
Grosclaude: Toponymic Dictionary of communes, Béarn, 2006 
Cassini: Cassini Map from 1750
Ldh/EHESS/Cassini: 

Origins:
Barcelona: Titles of Barcelona.
Luntz:
Census: Census of Béarn
Barétous: Titles of the Valley of Barétous
Cour Major: Regulations of the Cour Major
Reformation: Reformation of Béarn
Insinuations: Insinuations of the Diocese of Oloron 
Notaries: Notaries of Oloron
Regulation: Regulation of Arette

History
In 1385 there were 87 fires in Arette and it depended on the Bailiwick of Oloron.

On 13 August 1967 the village of Arette was 80% destroyed by an earthquake that killed one person. The ruined clock tower of the church indicated the exact time of the earthquake: 11:10 p.m. Seismic waves were felt from Pau to Tarbes and Bayonne.

Heraldry

Administration
List of Successive Mayors

Mayors from 1942

Inter-communality
Arette is part of six inter-communal structures:
 the Communauté de communes du Haut Béarn;
 the SIVU La Verna;
 the energy association of Pyrénées-Atlantiques;
 the inter-communal association for study and management of the Drainage basin of the Vert and its tributaries;
 the joint association for la Pierre Saint-Martin;
 the joint association for Haut-Béarn.

Twinning

Arette has twinning associations with:
 Isaba (Spain) since 1977. 
 Roncal (Spain) since 1991.

Demography
In 2017 the commune had 1,057 inhabitants.

Distribution of Age Groups
The population of the town is relatively old.

Percentage Distribution of Age Groups in Arette and Pyrénées-Atlantiques Department in 2017

Source: INSEE

Economy
The economy of the commune is primarily oriented toward agriculture and livestock (cattle and sheep) and logging. The town is part of the Appellation d'origine contrôlée (AOC) zone designation of Ossau-iraty.

Culture and Heritage

Civil heritage
The Barétous Museum is located in the commune. It features permanent collections on pastoralism and the Junta Roncal or "Tribute of the Three Cows".

Religious heritage

The former Lay Abbey (17th century) is registered as an historical monument.

The Arette Church contains several items that are registered as historical objects:
A Chandelier (18th century)
An Altar and Retable (18th century)
An Eagle-Lectern (15th century)
A Statue: Virgin and child (16th century)

Environmental heritage
The Soum de Liorry (1,012m)
The Biscarroules Peak (1,017m)
The Sudou Peak (1,167m)
The Légorre Peak(1,359m)
The Soum de Soudet(1,542m)
The Guilhers Peak(1,597m)
The Soum de Leche (1,839m)
The Arlas Peak (2,044m) on the Spanish border
The Arres d'Anie(2,120m)

There is an arboretum in the east of the commune.

Arette Picture Gallery

Facilities

Education
Arette has a public college: the College of Arette Barétous and a primary school.

Sports and sports facilities
The Basque pelota Club trains on the village fronton.

The town is located on the route of the 16th stage of the Tour de France 2007 which took place on 25 July. On Bastille Day 2015 the Tour will pass through the town again. 218 km route linked Orthez to Gourette - Col d'Aubisque.

The Hill-climbing event, organized since 1984, is listed as a championship of France.

Notable people linked to the commune
Jacques I d'Arette de Béarn-Bonasse, baptized around 1600 in Béarn and died in 1666 in Saint-Castin, was a lord of Bonasse and lay abbot of Arette.
Henri Pellisson , Félibrige and member of the Escole Gastoû Febus affiliated to Félibrige (1846-1912), first at the Acadèmia dels Jòcs Florals (Academy of Floral Games) of Toulouse in 1898 for his poem Notre Dame de Sarrance.
Renée Massip, born in 1907 at Arette and died in Paris in 2002, he was a French writer, winner of the Prix Interallié in 1963.
Pierre Aristouy born on 18 October 1920 at Arette and died on 20 April 1974. A former French rugby player who played with the French team and in the Section Paloise in the position of second line or prop.
Paul Ambille, born in 1930 at Béziers and died in 2010 in Arette, was a French painter.
Nelson Paillou, president of the CNOSF (French Olympic Committee) lived in Arette.
Marie Bourdet Well known cheese farmer in Southern France; Sonoma Valley communities

See also
 Col de la Pierre St Martin
 GR 10 footpath
 Communes of the Pyrénées-Atlantiques department

References

External links
Arrete on the 1750 Cassini Map

Communes of Pyrénées-Atlantiques